Isogenic may refer to:

Zygosity
Isogenic human disease models

See also 

 Isogenous (disambiguation)